Tatyana Eduardovna Lipnitskaya (born  17 September 1985), better known by her stage name Bianka, is a Belarusian singer, songwriter and rapper. She rose to prominence in 2005 with the release of her song Swan which later on became the soundtrack to the Russian film, Бой с тенью, Shadow Boxing.

Aside from Belarus, she is popular in Russia, FSU and Israel.

Biography and career
Tatiana was born on September 17, 1985, in Minsk.

As a child, she sang in choir and participated in folk dance groups. However, she was expelled from the choir for non-traditional vocals. In 2005 Bianka received a formal offer to represent Belarus in the international "Eurovision Song Contest" and at the same time, she was invited to work in Moscow, with Sergei Parkhomenko (Serge). She declined. In the same year, Bianca with Max Lawrence released the song "Swan", which later was put on the soundtrack of the film " Shadow Boxing ". In 2006 came the album "Russian Folk R'n'B". In the same year, the singer’s debut music video for the song “There Were Dances” was released. There is also an English version of this song.

In 2007 she published a collection of her songs on the album- "On the summer." In 2008 – the album "38 locks".In 2011 came the album "Our Generation" was released, in which she released songs in hip-hop, rap. In 2013, Bianka released the album “Bianka.Music”, in this album dance music was presented.

Studio albums
 Russian Folk R'n'B (2006)
 About Summer (2007)
 38 Locks (2008)
 Our Generation (2011)
 Bianka. Music (2014)
 Thoughts In Notes (2016)
 Than I love (2018)
 Harmony (2018)

References and footnotes

External links
 Bianka's Official Site
 Bianka on Instagram 

Russian dance musicians
Russian techno musicians
1985 births
Living people
21st-century Belarusian women singers
Belarusian emigrants to Russia
Russian people of Belarusian descent
Musicians from Minsk
Russian folk-pop singers
21st-century Russian women singers
21st-century Russian singers
Winners of the Golden Gramophone Award